Street Signs is a television business program that originally aired on CNBC, and currently airs on CNBC Asia and CNBC Europe.  Before the Asian version debuted on March 31, 2014, it was broadcast on CNBC at 2:00pm ET.  The CNBC United States version's final episode aired on February 6, 2015, due to Power Lunch returning to a two-hour format.  The European version of Street Signs, which is aired in a one-hour format on CNBC Europe, debuted January 4, 2016.

List of Street Signs anchors

CNBC US
Maria Bartiromo (2pm ET, 1999–2002)
Ron Insana (1996–2002 (3pm ET, 1999–2002); 2003–2006)
Erin Burnett (2006–2011)
Amanda Drury & Brian Sullivan (2011–2015)

CNBC Asia
Oriel Morrison (2014–2019)
Martin Soong (2014–2019)
Tanvir Gill (2019–present)
Nancy Hungerford (2019–2021)
 Teymoor Nabili (2022–present)

CNBC Europe
Louisa Bojesen (2016–2017)
Carolin Roth (2016–2018)
Joumanna Bercetche (2019–present)
Julianna Tatelbaum (2023–present)

About the show
This program focuses on the day's market action.  In addition, prominent analysts, investors and executives regularly appear on the program to offer their perspective.

CNBC

Street Signs was originally a two-hour programme that aired on CNBC from 1996 to February 1, 2002.  It was cancelled effective February 4, 2002 and Power Lunch occupied its vacated slot as a result of CNBC's revamped programming line-up.  On December 8, 2003, former Business Center co-anchor and original host Ron Insana revived Street Signs.   And in March 2006, Squawk on the Street co-anchor Erin Burnett replaced Insana as the programme's new host.  Burnett left CNBC on May 6, 2011. After Erin Burnett's departure Amanda Drury (late of CNBC Asia) and Brian Sullivan (late of the Fox Business Network) became this program's new anchor team and were to be the show's final anchors.

On October 13, 2014, Street Signs was launched in full 1080i high-definition as part of CNBC's network-wide switch to a full 16:9 letterbox presentation.

One notable segment of the programme, which aired at 2:40pm ET, the "Stop Trading!" segment, was presented by Jim Cramer (host of another CNBC program, Mad Money).  In this segment, which formerly aired on Closing Bell prior to 2006-09-11, the co-anchors asked Cramer about the stocks making news, and also asked him for his take on the day's markets.  After the segment, a full-screen disclaimer was shown as Street Signs go to a commercial break. Cramer's "Stop Trading!" segment was moved to the end of the first hour of Squawk on the Street on February 9, 2015. Jim Cramer's on-air tirade about the weakening economy, which was seen during the "Stop Trading!" segment of this program on 2007-08-03, garnered widespread attention and helped galvanise the Federal Reserve Board to cut interest rates.

From its January 4, 2016 debut through September 30, 2020, on Mondays from October 12, 2020 to October 24, 2022 and again on weekdays since November 7, 2022, the European version of Street Signs is the only CNBC Europe program that is aired on CNBC's United States channel.  Coincidentally (as previously mentioned), CNBC's own version of Street Signs aired its last show 11 months earlier, on February 6, 2015.

CNBC Asia
CNBC Asia's version of Street Signs debuted March 31, 2014, with Martin Soong and Oriel Morrison as co-anchors.  Soong was previously a longtime co-anchor of Asia Squawk Box (he has since returned to that show in the same role) and Morrison was anchor of the now-cancelled Cash Flow.  Beginning December 2, 2019, the anchor team consisted of Tanvir Gill and Nancy Hungerford, both of whom replaced Morrison and Soong as co-anchors on that date.  Hungerford departed from CNBC on July 2, 2021, and since July 5 of that same year until early 2022, Gill has been working with other fill-in presenters, such as Amanda Drury (former co-anchor of the defunct US version) and Christine Tan.  As of April 2022, Street Signs Asia is anchored by Gill and Teymoor Nabili (who returned to CNBC Asia for his second stint at the network that spring).  The background music for both the Asian and European versions is the same as CNBC Asia's The Rundown and CNBC United States' Squawk Alley (the latter two shows no longer air as of July 2021).

This programme originally aired in a two-hour format until October 29, 2018, when it was expanded to three hours (9:00 a.m. - 12:00 p.m. SIN/HK) due to the cancellation of The Rundown.

CNBC Europe
CNBC Europe's version of Street Signs debuted January 4, 2016.  Airing in a one-hour format from 10:00 a.m. to 11:00 a.m. CET, it replaced the first hour of Worldwide Exchange, which itself had its airtime halved to one hour. However, the programme is occasionally extended to two hours on American bank holidays.  The CNBC Europe version of Street Signs was originally co-anchored by Louisa Bojesen and Carolin Roth.  Bojesen was previously anchor of the now-cancelled European Closing Bell and Roth, who became the solo anchor of Street Signs following Bojesen's departure from CNBC Europe on April 28, 2017, was previously co-anchor of Worldwide Exchange.  Following Carolin Roth's own departure from the programme at the end of 2018, reporter and fill-in anchor Joumanna Bercetche became the permanent anchor of the programme in 2019.  Julianna Tatelbaum, who also joined CNBC Europe as a correspondent and fill-in anchor in 2018, joined Bercetche as a permanent co-anchor of the programme in January 2023.

Street Signs Europe was also broadcast on CNBC's United States channel on weekdays from 4:00 a.m. to 5:00 a.m. ET until it was replaced with a rebroadcast of The News with Shepard Smith on October 1, 2020.  From October 12, 2020 to October 24, 2022, Street Signs Europe aired on the main United States channel only on Mondays although it continued to be carried on CNBC's United States sister channel, CNBC World, for the rest of the week (Tuesday through Friday).  Occasionally, if there are major breaking news stories overnight on Tuesday through Friday, CNBC's United States channel will also carry Street Signs Europe, without prior notice to viewers.  Following the cancellation of The News with Shepherd Smith on November 3, 2022, Street Signs Europe once again began to be shown each weekday on CNBC's United States channel from November 7, 2022.

References

External links
Street Signs Asia official website on CNBC.com
Street Signs Europe official website on CNBC.com
Street Signs official blog on CNBC.com: Street Talk (since 2006-12-04)

CNBC original programming
CNBC Europe original programming
CNBC Asia original programming
1990s American television news shows
2000s American television news shows
1996 American television series debuts
2002 American television series endings
2003 American television series debuts
1990s American television talk shows
2000s American television talk shows
Business-related television series